Gauri Mahadevi, was the queen regnant of the Indian Bhauma-Kara dynasty's Kingdom of Toshala in cirka 910-916. It is possible that she was in fact Regent during the minority of her daughter queen Dandi Mahadevi rather than a monarch in her own right.

She was married to Subhakaradeva V. 

She succeeded her late spouse on the throne when he died. Not much is known about her reign. However, she is described as a successful ruler, who managed to maintain law and order within the kingdom. The Kumurang plate of Dandi Mahadevi stated that:
“….. at her lotus-like feet was prostrate the entire population (of the kingdom)”.

In 916 she was succeeded by her daughter Dandi Mahadevi.

References 

 Archana Garodia Gupta, The Women Who Ruled India: Leaders. Warriors. Icons.

10th-century women rulers
10th-century Indian monarchs
10th-century Indian women
10th-century Indian people
9th-century Indian women
9th-century Indian people